The Battle of Dandridge, January 17, 1864, was a minor battle of the American Civil War that occurred in Jefferson County, Tennessee.

Background
Wanting to push the Confederates out of their winter headquarters and having received reports of good forage south of the French Broad River, Union forces under Maj. Gen. John G. Parke advanced on Dandridge, near the East Tennessee & Virginia Railroad, on January 14, with orders to cross the river and occupy the area for the Federals. This movement forced Confederate Lt. Gen. James Longstreet, who had been operating around Dandridge, to fall back beyond Kimbrough's Crossroads. Longstreet brought up reinforcements from Morristown on January 15 to meet the Federals and threaten the Union base at New Market.

On January 16, Brig. Gen. Samuel D. Sturgis, commanding the Cavalry Corps, Army of the Ohio, rode forward from Dandridge along the Morristown Road (now Valley Home Rd., State Hwy 66) to occupy Kimbrough's Crossroads. As the Union cavalry neared the crossroads, they discovered and engaged one of Longstreet's infantry brigades with artillery that had arrived the day before. The brigade was composed of Alabama troops, as well as others, and was under the command of Brigadier General Micah Jenkins, a South Carolinian. At the same time Union cavalry under the command of Col. Frank Wolford engaged Confederate forces south and east of Dandridge on the bend of Chucky Road. The Union cavalry could not dislodge the Confederate troops and were compelled to retire to Dandridge.

Battle

Around noon on January 17, Sturgis received information that the Confederates were preparing for an attack, so he formed his men into lines of battle. About 4:00 p.m., the Confederates advanced towards Dandridge and the battle quickly turned to general fighting. The battle continued until after dark with the Union forces occupying roughly the same battle line as when the fighting started. Having failed to cross the river to the opposite bank, and fearing that Longstreet's entire force was in front of them, General Parke ordered the Federals to retreat to New Market and Strawberry Plains during the night. The Confederates pursued, but due to the lack of cannons, ammunition, and shoes, broke off and fell back to Dandridge. For the time being, the Union forces left the area.

References

External links
Original Records Operations about Dandridge, Tenn., including skirmishes (16th) at Kimbrough's Cross-Roads and on Bend of Chucky Road, and action (17th) near Dandridge.
National Park Service battle description
CWSAC Report Update and Resurvey: Individual Battlefield Profiles

Dandridge
Dandridge
Dandridge
Dandridge
Jefferson County, Tennessee
Dandridge
1864 in Tennessee
January 1864 events